Vagococcus penaei is a species of bacteria. It is Gram-positive, catalase-negative and coccus-shaped. Its type strain is CD276T (=LMG 24833T =CIP 109914T).

References

Further reading

External links
LPSN

Type strain of Vagococcus penaei at BacDive -  the Bacterial Diversity Metadatabase

Lactobacillales
Bacteria described in 2009